François Marchand (c.1500 - August 1551) was a French sculptor. He was born in Orléans and died in Paris. He made several sculpted groups for the choir wall of Chartres Cathedral and the tomb of King Francis I in the Basilica of Saint-Denis.

References

External links (in French) 
 Cathédrale de Chartres - Tour du chœur : François Marchand
 Base Joconde : Marchand François
 Académie d'Orléans - Fiche enseignant : Tour du chœur de la cathédrale de Chartres - Le Massacre des Saints Innocents (François Marchand) 

16th-century French sculptors
French Renaissance sculptors
Artists from Orléans
1551 deaths
Year of birth uncertain